Yaraana is a 1995 Bollywood romantic thriller film directed by David Dhawan and starring Madhuri Dixit, Rishi Kapoor, Raj Babbar, Kader Khan and Shakti Kapoor. It is loosely based on the American film Sleeping with the Enemy, starring Julia Roberts. The film is known for the hit song "Mera Piya Ghar Aaya".

At the 41st Filmfare Awards, Yaraana won Best Female Playback Singer (Kavita Krishnamurthy for "Mera Piya Ghar Aaya"), in addition to a Best Actress for Dixit.

Plot 

Lalita catches the eye of JB and he immediately falls in love with her and decides that he must have her. Her uncle Madhi arranges for them to get married but he is only doing this because JB is paying him to. When she refuses, JB kidnaps her and keeps her in his home until the day of the wedding. She is literally watched over by JB every day in case she tries to escape. On the day of the wedding, Lalita faints and uses this to escape. She also moves her mother away and barely escapes JB who assumes that she has been killed after he saw her being hit by a car. In fact, Lalita swapped her wedding dress with someone else, so the person that JB saw being hit by the car was not Lalita. 

Lalita escapes the city and meets Raj who at first she uses him as a cover but they both fall in love with each other. She uses the name Shikha instead. Raj's grandfather, Rai Saheb is happy that his grandson wants to marry Shikha and he arranges for a wedding. Unfortunately, JB finds out that Lalita is still alive through her mother and quickly traces her. JB tells Raj and his grandfather who Lalita really is with the help of her devious uncle. Lalita is taken away and is forced to be a dutiful wife, which in JB's terms means that she has to stay with him forever. After hiding and frustration, Lalita decides to take matters into her own hands.

Cast

Trivia
Govinda was first approached as the lead opposite Madhuri Dixit, but things did not work out. Upon Govinda's rejection, Jackie Shroff was approached, but his dates were blocked by other projects. This resulted in Rishi Kapoor being part of the movie.

Kamal Hassan was offered Raj Babbar's role, but declined it because he did not want to play a villain.

Awards 

 41st Filmfare Awards:

Won

 Best Female Playback Singer – Kavita Krishnamurthy for "Mera Piya Ghar Aaya"

Nominated

 Best Actress – Madhuri Dixit

Soundtrack

The music was composed by Anu Malik with lyrics written by Rahat Indori, Anwar Sagar, Rani Malik & Maya Govind. The songs are sung by Kavita Krishnamurthy, Udit Narayan, Sapna Mukherjee, Vinod Rathod and Shankar Mahadevan. This music album is heavily plagiarized from the work of legendary Nusrat Fateh Ali Khan's work. "Mera Piya Ghar Aaya" and "Loye Loye" are a complete rip-off of Nusrat's compositions of same title.

References

External links
 
 
 

1995 films
1990s Hindi-language films
Films directed by David Dhawan
Films scored by Anu Malik
Indian remakes of American films
Films about domestic violence
Indian romantic thriller films
1990s psychological drama films
1990s romantic thriller films